Sir Arthur Weir Mason (2 August 1860 – 8 June 1924) was a South African judge who served as Judge President of the Transvaal Provincial Division of the Supreme Court of South Africa.

Early life and education
Mason was born in Pondoland, a rural area in the eastern part of the Cape Colony, but spent his early life in Durban and was sent to England to receive his schooling in Bath and Eastbourne. He later attended the University of London and in 1879 obtained the BA degree with honours in Classics and German.

Career
In 1880, Mason returned to Natal, where he qualified as an attorney and in 1884 he was admitted as an advocate. He mainly practised in Pietermaritzburg and in January 1896 became a puisne judge of the Natal Supreme Court. On several occasions he acted for Sir Michael Gallwey as chief justice of Natal. After the Second Boer War he was appointed a judge of the Transvaal Supreme Court. In 1922 he was knighted and from 13 March 1923 to the time of his death, he was Judge President of the Transvaal Provincial Division of the Supreme Court.

See also
List of Judges President of the Gauteng Division of the High Court of South Africa

References

1860 births
1924 deaths
South African judges
19th-century South African judges
20th-century South African judges
South African Knights Bachelor
Alumni of the University of London
Transvaal Colony judges